Yesinskaya is a rural locality (a village) in Mishutinskoye Rural Settlement, Vozhegodsky District, Vologda Oblast, Russia. The population was 21 as of 2002.

Geography 
Yesinskaya is located 71 km east of Vozhega (the district's administrative centre) by road. Timoninskaya is the nearest rural locality.

References 

Rural localities in Vozhegodsky District